The Nightmare Neighbour Next Door is a British documentary television series broadcast on Channel 5 since 1 April 2014. The show follows some of the most extreme cases of fallouts between neighbours all over the country, using real-life interviews and reconstruction. The show has proven to be one of the most popular shows on the channel.

Premise
The hour-long show goes behind closed doors to find out what happened between neighbours when disputes arise, following some of the most extreme cases in the country. The dispute is usually told mostly from the point of view of the neighbour who reported their experiences to the show's producers, starting with how the feud started and then, to how it escalated. Both neighbours are approached for comment by the producers however. During each episode, up to 4 stories of neighbourly disputes can be covered, with the show normally going back and forth between them. The Nightmare Neighbour Next Door relies heavily on reconstructions.

Episodes
The first series aired on Tuesday nights at 8 PM (GMT). Starting with the second series, the show has aired on Wednesday nights at 8PM.

Series 1 (2014)

Series 2 (2014)

Series 3 (2015)

Series 4 (2015)

Series 5 (2016–2017)

Series 6 (2017–2019)

Series 7 (2020)

Series 8 (2021)

References

2014 British television series debuts
2010s British documentary television series
2020s British documentary television series
English-language television shows
Channel 5 (British TV channel) original programming